Slick is a nickname for:

 Slick Aguilar (born 1954), American guitarist, most notably with Jefferson Starship
 Slick Castleman (1913-1998), American Major League Baseball pitcher
 Slick Coffman (1910–2003), American Major League Baseball pitcher
 Chalmers Goodlin (1923–2005), one of the test pilots of the X-1
 Gene Host (1933-1998), American baseball pitcher
 Slick Johnson (1948-1990), American stock car racing driver
 Mark "Slick" Johnson, American professional wrestling referee
 Slick Jones (1907-1969), American jazz drummer
 Nick Kisner (born 1991), American boxer
 Bobby Leonard, former American Basketball Association and National Basketball Association player and coach
 Slick Lollar (1905-1945), National Football League player in the 1929 season
 Arthur Morton (American football) (1914-1999), American football player and college head coach
 E. R. Moulton (1900-1979), American educator, college football and baseball player and high school coach
 Slick Smith, American stock car racing driver in the 1940s and '50s
 Slick Watts (born 1951), American former National Basketball Association player

Lists of people by nickname